Hõbeda is a village in Kadrina Parish, Lääne-Viru County, in northeastern Estonia. It lies on the right bank of the Loobu River.

References
 

Villages in Lääne-Viru County
Kreis Wierland